Ernest Borisovich Vinberg (26 July 1937 – 12 May 2020) was a Soviet and Russian mathematician, who worked on Lie groups and algebraic groups, discrete subgroups of Lie groups, invariant theory, and representation theory. He introduced Vinberg's algorithm and the Koecher–Vinberg theorem.

He was a recipient of the 1997 Humboldt Prize. He was on the executive committee of the Moscow Mathematical Society. In 1983, he was an Invited Speaker with a talk on Discrete reflection groups in Lobachevsky spaces at the International Congress of Mathematicians in Warsaw. In 2010, he was elected an International Honorary Member of the American Academy of Arts and Sciences.

Ernest Vinberg died from pneumonia caused by COVID-19 on 12 May 2020.

Selected publications
 
 
 editor and co-author:  (contains Construction of the exceptional simple Lie algebras)
 with A. L. Onishchik:  2012 pbk edition
 with V. V. Gorbatsevich, A. L. Onishchik: 
 
 (ed.)  (contains: Vinberg et alia: Geometry of spaces of constant curvature, Discrete groups of motions of spaces of constant curvature)

References

External links

Humboldt Research Award
 Ernest Borisovich Vinberg, Moscow Mathematical Journal

1937 births
2020 deaths
20th-century Russian mathematicians
20th-century Russian non-fiction writers
21st-century Russian mathematicians
21st-century Russian non-fiction writers
Deaths from the COVID-19 pandemic in Russia
Fellows of the American Academy of Arts and Sciences
Group theorists
Moscow State University alumni
Academic staff of Moscow State University
Russian editors
Russian Jews
Russian male writers
Soviet Jews
Soviet mathematicians
Textbook writers

Mathematicians from Moscow